The Yambina were an Aboriginal Australian people of the state of Queensland, whose traditional lands lie inland (westwards) some distance from Mackay.

Country 
Yambina lands included Logan Creek south of Avon Downs. They ran east to the Denham Range and Logan Downs. The western extension lay around the area of Elgin Downs. They were also present at Solferino.

Social organisation
The marriage rules governing the Yambina were set forth by Wilson and Murray, who discerned two classes, the Youngaroo and the Wootharoo.

History of contact
Within a few decades of white settlement, it was estimated that the Yambina numbered 100.

Language

The language of the Yambina people was Yambina, considered a dialect of the Biri language. No speakers of the language have been recorded since before 1975.

Alternative names
AIATSIS' AUSTLANG lists:
 Jambina
 Jampa:l
 Jampal
 Muthoburra
 Mutholburra
 Narboo Murre
 Yambeena

Some words
 wanday (tame dog)
 marrara or mowara (wild dog)
 yabboo (father)
 younga (nerra) (mother)
 meekooloo (whiteman)

Notes

Citations

Sources

Aboriginal peoples of Queensland